The following is a list of Federal Communications Commission–licensed radio stations in the American state of Louisiana, which can be sorted by their call signs, frequencies, cities of license, licensees, and programming formats.

List of radio stations

Defunct
 KBYO
 KCJM-LP
 KCRJ-LP
 KDLA
 KEPZ
 KEZM
 KJCB
 KLIC
 KMCZ
 KMLB (1440 AM)
 KPCP
 KWHN-FM
 KXZZ
 WBYU
 WIBR
 WJVI
 WLRO

See also
 Louisiana media
 List of newspapers in Louisiana
 List of television stations in Louisiana
 Media of locales in Louisiana: Baton Rouge, Lafayette, Monroe, New Orleans, Shreveport, Terrebonne Parish

References

Bibliography

External links

  (Directory ceased in 2017)
 Louisiana Association of Broadcasters

Images

 
Louisiana
Radio